Wilfrid Airey (27 September 1907 – 19 July 1980) was a New Zealand cricketer. He played in seven first-class matches for Wellington from 1927 to 1940.

See also
 List of Wellington representative cricketers

References

External links
 

1907 births
1980 deaths
New Zealand cricketers
Wellington cricketers
Cricketers from Nelson, New Zealand